Al Salam Private School & Nursery is a British Curriculum private school located in Dubai, UAE.
Its original site was established in 1985 as a nursery, located in the historic communities of Dubai, in Al Rigga, to Al Muteena and later Hor Al Anz, from which the school opened in 1988.
It moved to the current location in Al Nahda 2 in 1994. It is one of the highest achieving schools in Dubai.

Al Salam School began as a nursery in 1985 and three years later, Al Salam Private School was established.  The location of the school changed as it grew and larger sites were used to accommodate the growing numbers.  Al Salam operated in Hor Al Anz through to its current site in Al Nahda 2.

The school ranks as one of the best value for money schools in Dubai. This is due to its low fees yet exceptionally high outcomes.  As a consequence, it is in high demand with waiting lists common in most years.

Leadership of the School
The school was founded by Sue Johnston, who served as its Principal for 29 years. She was Dubai's longest serving headteacher, who has been a key influencer in the education sector in Dubai and described as ‘inspirational,’ by the KHDA.

The school was led by Kausor Amin-Ali, who began his teaching career having qualified from the University of Cambridge.  He succeeded Sue Johnston in August 2017 until January 2019. He held the title of Principal & Executive Headteacher.  He is the author of a chapter entitled 'Education in the UAE: An Overview' as part of the book 'Education in the Arab World' by Dr Serra Kirdar.
From February 2019, the Principal is Craig Dyche-Nichols.

Expansion of the school to a second site

From September 2019, Al Salam Private School will become exclusively Primary.  The Secondary school will relocate to Al Twar 2, just  from the current site.  The new site will be purpose built and house a new Primary school.  Both of these new schools will be collectively known as Al Salam Community School.
The project for pre-opening of the new schools is being led by the Founding Principal Kausor Amin-Ali.

Both Primary schools will be feeders into the new larger Secondary school.

References

External links 

 

British international schools
Educational institutions established in 1985
International schools in the United Arab Emirates
Schools in Dubai
British international schools in the United Arab Emirates
1985 establishments in the United Arab Emirates